Synchiropus springeri, the Springer's dragonet, is a species of fish in the family Callionymidae, the dragonets. It is found in the Western  Pacific.

This species grows up to 1.8 cm (0.71 in) in length.

Etymology
The fish is named in honor of ichthyologist Victor G. Springer of the U.S. National Museum, who was the one who collected the type specimens during his Fiji Islands Expedition in 1982 and loaned the specimens and many other specimens to Fricke for examination.

References

springeri
Fish of the Pacific Ocean
Taxa named by Ronald Fricke
Fish described in 1983